James David  Bourchier (18 December 1850 at Baggotstown near Limerick – 30 December 1920 in Sofia, Bulgaria) was an Irish journalist and political activist. He lived in Sofia from 1892 to 1915. Bourchier was an honourable member of the Sofia Journalists' Society. He acted as an intermediary between the Balkan states in the beginning and at the conclusion of the Balkan Wars of 1912-1913.

Life

Bourchier was born in Limerick and studied at Portora Royal School, Enniskillen and Trinity College Dublin, where he was elected a scholar in classics in 1871. 
Deeply engaged in the processes that were taking place on the Balkan peninsula at that time, Bourchier supported the idea that the island of Crete be annexed by Greece.

In his writings he criticised certain clauses of the Bucharest Peace Treaty of 1913, which he deemed unfair to Bulgaria. As a result of the treaty Bulgaria lost the southern part of Dobrudja (which was annexed by Romania), and part of Macedonia.

Bourchier also expressed his strong support for Bulgaria during the Paris Peace Conference of 1919-1920. The conference produced five treaties, including the Treaty of Neuilly (the peace agreement between the Allies and Bulgaria). Under the terms of the treaty, Bulgaria had to cede part of Western Thrace to Greece and several border areas to Yugoslavia. Southern Dobrudja was confirmed in Romanian possession, reparations were required, and the Bulgarian Army was limited to 20,000 men.

With his numerous publications in the British press, and in his private and social correspondence, Bourchier repeatedly voiced his sympathy towards Bulgaria and its people. According to The Times: "He was a private man, nervous, haunted by growing deafness, probably homosexual, but he became the close confidant of kings and ambassadors in their labyrinthine intrigues." After his death in December 1920, James Bourchier was buried near the Rila Monastery in southwestern Bulgaria. He remains the only foreigner ever allowed to be buried at the one of the greatest monasteries in Bulgaria, on behalf of a grateful Bulgarian nation.

Honours
Bourchier Peak on Rila Mountain, James Bourchier Boulevard and James Bourchier Metro Station in Sofia, and Bourchier Cove on Smith Island in the South Shetland Islands, Antarctica are named after James David Bourchier.

In 1990 the recently established Bulgarian Society for British Studies devoted its first national conference to the 140th anniversary of Bourchier’s birth, in Limerick, Ireland, and 70th anniversary of his death.

Today James Bourchier Boulevard is a busy street in Sofia with numerous administrative and office buildings on it. Its most notable landmark is probably the Hotel Marinela Sofia. The Faculty of Physics, the Faculty of Mathematics and Informatics, and the Faculty of Chemistry of Sofia University are also located there, as is the office of the Union of Physicists in Bulgaria and the headquarters of the Bulgarian Red Cross. There are also  streets named after him in Varna and Blagoevgrad.

Notes

External links
 James David Bourchier in 'Miscellaneous Limerick People' file at Limerick City Library, Ireland

Bibliography

 W. B. Stanford gives an account of James David Bourchier, b. Bruff, Co. Limerick, Ireland, who assisted the Greeks in the insurrection in Crete of 1896; bibl.
 Lady Grogan, Life of J. D. Bourchier (London 1926).
 
 
 
 

1850 births
1920 deaths
Burials at the Rila Monastery
Irish expatriates in Bulgaria
Irish journalists
People of the Balkan Wars
The Times journalists
Scholars of Trinity College Dublin
War correspondents of the Balkan Wars